Line 3 of the Pune Metro is the third line of the city's under-construction mass transit network. It will run from Civil Court, Pune to Megapolis Pune in Hinjawadi. The 23.3-km line will be completely elevated and will have 23 stations and will align with the MahaMetro lines at the Civil Court interchange station. The construction will be taken up in two phases, the section between Hinjawadi and Balewadi is expected to be taken up first followed by the section between Balewadi and Civil Court, Shivaji Nagar. A metro car shed will be built in Hinjawadi. The MIDC will provide 55 acres of land in Hinjawadi for setting up a Metro rail depot. On 3 August 2018, PMRDA announced the final bidder for the project — the joint venture Tata Realty-Siemens. and Siemens On 3 October 2018, Tata Realty-Siemens were awarded the contract to execute the project on a design, build, finance, operate and transfer model. The formal concession agreement was signed in September 2019  with the construction expected to begin in March 2020. The project is set to be completed in March 2023.

Route 
Metropolitan Line will run from Civil Court, Pune to Megapolis Pune in Hinjawadi. The  line will be completely elevated and will have 23 stations and will align with the MahaMetro lines at the Civil Court interchange station.
Depot will be located at Maan village. It will be spread across 20 hectares.

List of Stations
Following is a list of stations on this route:

Construction
Contract for conducting geotechnical investigation was awarded to Soiltech India Private Limited. Geotechnical investigation commenced on June 19, 2019. However, due to COVID-19 pandemic and subsequent nationwide lockdown, work on several projects had been delayed, including Line 3. Following a gap of nearly 11 months, piling works resumed at multiple locations near Hinjawadi in May 2020.

Extension
PMRDA proposed an extension of Line 3 from Civil Court station towards Hadapsar. In-principle approval for DPR was given by the then CM and PMRDA head Devendra Fadnavis in December 2018. DPR for extension is being prepared by Delhi Metro Rail Corporation under supervision of PMRDA.
As per draft DPR submitted by PMRDA, proposed stations for extension will be Railway Colony, Collector's Office, MG Road, Fashion Street, Mhammadevi Chowk, Race Course, Kaluba Chowk, Vaiduwadi, Hadapsar Phata, Hadapsar Gadital bus stand, Civil Aviation Ground, Phursungi IT Park and Sulabh Garden.

In December 2020, DMRC announced bid to conduct geotechnical investigation works for DPR preparation for Hadapsar-Loni Kalbhor extension.

References 

Pune Metro lines